Ratinger Lowen was an ice hockey team in Ratingen, Germany founded in 1979. They played in the Deutsche Eishockey Liga from 1994-1997.

History
Ratinger played in the Regionalliga for the 1984-85 season, which they promptly won, and were promoted to the Oberliga. They won the Oberliga two years later, and were promoted to the 2nd Bundesliga. Ratinger was promoted to the 1.Bundesliga after a second-place finish in the 2.Bundesliga. When the 1.Bundesliga became the Deutsche Eishockey Liga in 1994, Ratinger continued playing there until they folded in 1997.

A successor club, Revierlöwen Oberhausen, was founded in 1997 and operated until 2007.

Season-by-season record

External links
Club profile on hockeyarenas.net

Ice hockey teams in Germany
Ice hockey clubs established in 1979
Sports clubs disestablished in 1997
Deutsche Eishockey Liga teams